Quercus × subconvexa is a naturally-occurring hybrid oak, found in California.

References

Trees of the West Coast of the United States
Hybrid plants
subconvexa